Charles Woodrow Wilson (January 13, 1905 – December 19, 1970) was a professional baseball player. Nicknamed "Swamp Baby", he played parts of four seasons in Major League Baseball for the Boston Braves and St. Louis Cardinals, mostly as either a shortstop or third baseman.

References

External links

Major League Baseball infielders
Boston Braves players
St. Louis Cardinals players
Danville Veterans players
Rochester Red Wings players
Columbus Red Birds players
Montreal Royals players
Jersey City Giants players
Presbyterian Blue Hose baseball players
Baseball players from South Carolina
1905 births
1970 deaths
People from Clinton, South Carolina
Burials at Mount Hope Cemetery (Rochester)